The 2019–20 LEN Euro Cup was the 28th edition of the second-tier European tournament for water polo clubs. It ran from 13 September 2019 to 9 May 2020.

Overview

Calendar
The calendar of the competition was announced on 3 August 2019.

Participating teams
16 teams participated at the QR1 with half of them advancing to QR2. The four teams eliminated from the Champions League QR3 joined the qualified teams in the Quarterfinals.

Qualifying phase

Qualification round I

Pools composition
The draw was held on 4 August 2019. The cities selected to host the groups were Eger (Hungary), Split (Croatia), Syracuse (Italy) and Valletta (Malta).

Group A

Group B

Group C

Group D

Qualification round II

Pools composition
The draw for this stage of the competition was held at LEN headquarters in Nyon (Switzerland) on 17 September 2019. The hosts of the two groups were Mataró (Spain) and Šibenik (Croatia).

Group E

Group F

Knockout stage

Quarterfinals
The draw was held in Nyon (Switzerland), at LEN offices, on 1 October 2019.

|}

First leg

Second leg

Semifinals
The draw for the semifinals took place on 12 November 2019.

|}

First leg

Second leg

1
2

See also
2019–20 LEN Champions League
2019 LEN Super Cup

References

External links
Official LEN website
Microplustiming (Official results website)

LEN Euro Cup seasons
Euro Cup
2019 in water polo
2020 in water polo
LEN Euro Cup